Wasola is an unincorporated community in northern Ozark County, Missouri, United States. It is located sixteen miles north of Gainesville on Route 5, at its northern intersection with Route 95. The Ozark–Douglas county line is approximately one–half mile north of the town. A few businesses and homes are located there.

The community was founded in 1912 and its name has an unknown derivation, according to Ramsay, possibly it is a coinage that is reminiscent of a Native American word. The Wasola post office was established in 1914 and has Zip code 65773.

Demographics

References

Unincorporated communities in Ozark County, Missouri
Unincorporated communities in Missouri